John Grange (July 27, 1949) is an American politician who served as a member of the Kansas House of Representatives for the 75th district from 2005 to 2013.

Early life and education 
Grange was born in El Dorado, Kansas, and attended Butler Community College, where he obtained an associated degree.

Career 
Grange served as president of Unified School District 490 Board of Education from 2004 to 2005 and was a member of the board from 2001 to 2005.

Grange served in the Kansas House of Representatives from 2005 until 2013. In 2012, Grange ran for the 14th district of the Kansas Senate, but lost in the primary to fellow Republican State Representative Forrest Knox.

Grange works as a mechanical contractor and is the president and owner of Carlisle Heating, Air Conditioning, Plumbing and Electrical. He is a member of the American Legion, Elks Club, and Veterans of Foreign Wars.

References

External links
 Official Website
 Kansas Legislature - John Grange
 Project Vote Smart profile
 Kansas Votes profile
 State Surge - Legislative and voting track record
 Campaign contributions: 2004, 2006, 2008

Republican Party members of the Kansas House of Representatives
Living people
1949 births
21st-century American politicians
Butler Community College alumni